Battle Array  (aṣ-Ṣaff, aka "The Ranks") is the 61st chapter (sūrah) of the Quran, with 14 verses (āyāt). This sura is an Al-Musabbihat sura because it begins with the glorification of Allah.

Summary
1 All things in the universe praise God
2-4 Muslims exhorted to be faithful and to fight for Islam
5 This exhortation enforced by the example of Moses
6 Jesus foretells a Messenger named Ahmad
7-8 Jesus was rejected as a sorcerer notwithstanding his miracles
9 Islam to be exalted above every other religion
10-11 Muslims exhorted to seek wealth by fighting for Islam
12-13 The rewards of those who fight for the faith
14 Muslims exhorted to follow the example of the apostles of Jesus

Hadith
The first and foremost exegesis/tafsir of the Qur'an is found in hadith of Muhammad. Although some scholars, including ibn Taymiyyah, claim that Muhammad has commented on the whole of the Qur'an, others such as Ghazali cite the limited amount of narratives, thus indicating that he has commented only on a portion of the Qur'an. Ḥadīth (حديث) is literally "speech" or "report", that is a recorded saying or tradition of Muhammad validated by isnad; with Sirah Rasul Allah these comprise the sunnah and reveal shariah. According to Aishah, the life of Muhammad was practical implementation of Qur'an. Therefore, mention in hadith elevates the importance of the pertinent surah from a certain perspective.

 Abdullah ibn Salam narrated: “A group of us Companions of the Messenger of Allah (ﷺ) sat talking, and we said: ‘If we knew which deed was most beloved to Allah then we would do it.’ So Allah, Most High, revealed: Whatsoever is in the heavens and whatsoever is on the earth glorifies Allah. And He is Almighty, the All-Wise. O you who believe! Why do you say that which you do not do? As-Saff (1-2)”...

Notes

References 

Saff
Jesus in Islam

fi:Suura#Luettelo